The surname Korte  may refer to:

The surname Körte spelled without diacritics
Bernhard Korte, German mathematician and computer scientist
Eero Korte, Finnish football midfielder
Elizabeth Korte, American television writer
Gerard de Korte, Dutch Roman Catholic clergyman, bishop of the diocese of Groningen-Leeuwarden
Gianluca Korte, German footballer
Jan Korte, former football player from the Netherlands
Jan Korte (politician) (born 1977), German politician
Hans Korte, German television actor
Karl Korte, American composer of contemporary classical music
Karl Korte, American jockey
Oldřich František Korte, Czech composer, pianist, publicist and writer
Pat Korte, American political activist and organizer for Students for a Democratic Society (SDS)
Raffael Korte, German footballer
Ralph Korte, the namesake of the Ralph Korte Stadium 
Steven Korte, American football running back
Steve Korte, former offensive guard and center in the NFL

See also
De Korte, Dutch surname